Villanueva de Cameros is a village in the province and autonomous community of La Rioja, Spain.

Demographics

Population centres
 Villanueva de Cameros
 Aldeanueva de Cameros

References

Populated places in La Rioja (Spain)